Ross Bagley is an American former actor and comedian. He is best known for his role as Nicky Banks in The Fresh Prince of Bel-Air as well as Dylan Dubrow in Independence Day. He also played Buckwheat in The Little Rascals.

Career 
Most popular as a child actor during the mid-1990s, Bagley is best known for his role as Nicholas “Nicky” Banks on the NBC sitcom The Fresh Prince of Bel-Air, between 1994 and 1996.

Bagley also portrayed Buckwheat in the feature film adaptation of 1994 of The Little Rascals, and along with his Fresh Prince co star Will Smith he appeared in the film Independence Day (1996).

Filmography

Awards and nominations

References

External links 

Year of birth missing (living people)
20th-century American male actors
21st-century American male actors
African-American male actors
African-American male child actors
American male child actors
American male film actors
American male television actors
American male voice actors
California State University, Northridge alumni
Living people
Male actors from Los Angeles
20th-century African-American people
21st-century African-American people